The STER, (short for Stichting Ether Reclame, in English: "Foundation for Ether Advertisement") is responsible for the broadcast of radio and television ads on the Dutch media service NPO. With the income from these, parts of the costs of public broadcasting are paid for.

STER was founded in 1965 as the Stichting tot Uitzenden van Reclame ("Foundation for the Broadcasting of Advertisements"); the name was changed to the present name that same year. STER is most famous for Loeki de Leeuw, an animated puppet which appeared at the beginning and ending of all of STER's commercials from 1972 until 2004, and again in 2019 and in 2021 onwards.

STER may not use more than 10% of the airtime per year on advertisement and daily not more than 15% and also not air ads within programs (as happens on the Dutch commercial stations). For programming with long runtimes, like UEFA Champions League events, they consider the pregame (produced by NOS), each half of the game (first half produced by AVRO, second half produced by KRO), halftime (produced by NCRV), and the postgame (produced by VARA) as separate standalone programs in their programming guide and air ads between them. STER is responsible for the contents of the ads which have to be strictly separate from the programs on the public networks and not influence the programming. Complaints about ads can be made at the Reclame Code Commissie (in English: "Advertising Code Committee", comparable to the Advertising Standards Authority in the UK). STER contributes about 200 million euro to the total budget of 900 million euro (2013) of the Dutch Public Broadcaster.

On November 8, 2001, STER introduced a new logo for the first time of 36 years since its establishment in 1965. The 36-year-old four-blocked diamond-cube logo was confined to history after 36 years of legal competition, and was replaced by a blue-lined diamond that contains the "Ster" wordmark which uses the Franklin Gothic typeface. The new logo debuted on STER's website on January 2, 2002.

References

External links
 
 Official website 

Dutch public broadcasting organisations
Netherlands Public Broadcasting
Dutch-language television networks
Television channels and stations established in 1965
Advertising agencies of the Netherlands